Mahanadi Shankar is an Indian stage, film and television actor, who has appeared in Tamil language films and serials as supporting actor and negative roles. He has appeared in films including Mahanadi (1994), Baashha (1995), Ratchagan (1997), Amarkalam (1999) and Dheena (2001). The success of the former film, meant that he used the title as a prefix to his stagename.

Career
After making his debut as an actor in Mahanadi (1994), Shankar has worked in several Tamil films in the 1990s, 2000s and 2010s as a supporting actor, often as an antagonist or a comedy villain. In the movie Dheena, he used to Call Ajith Kumar As "Thala". Henceforth Ajith Kumar is called as "Thala" by his fans.

Filmography

Amma Vanthachu (1992)
Mahanadi (1994)
Namma Annachi (1994)
Vanaja Girija (1994)
Aasai (1995)
Baashha (1995)
En Pondatti Nallava (1995)
Ragasiya Police (1995)
Indian (1996)
Panchalankurichi (1996)
Senathipathi (1996)
Vaazhga Jananayagam (1996)
Vishwanath (1996)
Abhimanyu (1997)
Pagaivan (1997)
Pasamulla Pandiyare (1997)
Ratchagan (1997)
Thadayam (1997)
Golmaal (1998)
Dhinamdhorum (1998)
Veeram Vilanja Mannu (1998)
Pudhumai Pithan (1998)
Amarkalam (1999)
Adutha Kattam (1999)
Malabar Police (1999)
Unnai Thedi (1999)
Kann Thirandhu Paaramma (2000)
Manu Needhi (2000)
Dheena (2001)
Dosth (2001)
Alli Thandha Vaanam (2001)
Alli Arjuna (2002)
Red (2002)
Amaiyappan (2002)
Charlie Chaplin (2002)
Ivan (2002)
Shree (2002)
Arputham (2002)
Maaran (2002)
Game (2002)
Ramanaa (2002)
Ramachandra (2003)
Naam (2003)
Galatta Ganapathy (2003)
Anjaneya (2003)
Ottran (2003)
Gajendra (2004)
Arasatchi (2004)
Giri (2004)
Jaisurya (2004)
Jananam (2004)
Iyer IPS (2005)
Sukran (2005)
Chanakya (2005)
Mazhai (2005)
Kusthi (2006)
Vanjagan (2006)
Perarasu (2006)
Vathiyar (2006)
Thottal Poo Malarum (2007)
Thiru Ranga (2007)
Marudhamalai (2007)
Vasool (2008)
Siva Manasula Sakthi (2009)
Munnar (2009)
Sirithal Rasipen (2009)
Engal Aasan (2009)
Sindhanai Sei (2009)
Vedappan (2009)
Sura (2010)
Thamizh Padam (2010)
Oru Kal Oru Kannadi (2012) 
Mirattal (2012) 
Etho Seithai Ennai (2012)
Aachariyangal (2012)
Idharkuthane Aasaipattai Balakumara (2013)
Amara (2014)
Vellaikaara Durai (2014)
Yaamirukka Bayamey (2014)
Kalkandu (2014)
Vindhai (2015)
Eli (2015)
Vandha Mala (2015)
Vaaliba Raja (2016)
Veera Sivaji (2016)
Jackson Durai (2016)
Azhahendra Sollukku Amudha (2016)
Motta Shiva Ketta Shiva (2017)
Julieum 4 Perum (2017)
Senjittale En Kadhala (2017)
Saravanan Irukka Bayamaen (2017)
Padaiveeran (2018)
Irumbu Thirai (2018)
Dev (2019)
100 (2019)
Jackpot (2019)
Petromax (2019)
Sollunganne Sollunga (2020)
Chithirame Solladi (2020)
Master (2021)
Parris Jeyaraj (2021)
IPC 376 (2021)
Gulu Gulu (2022)
Thunivu (2023)
Pallu Padama Paathukka (2023)

Television

References

External links 
 

Living people
Male actors in Tamil cinema
21st-century Indian male actors
Tamil comedians
People from Tamil Nadu
1955 births